Rosamund Mary Ellen Pike (born 1979) is a British actress. She began her acting career by appearing in stage productions such as Romeo and Juliet and Gas Light. After her screen debut in the television film A Rather English Marriage (1998), she received international recognition for her film debut as Bond girl Miranda Frost in Die Another Day (2002), for which she received the Empire Award for Best Newcomer. Following her breakthrough, she won the BIFA Award for Best Supporting Actress for The Libertine (2004) and portrayed Jane Bennet in Pride & Prejudice (2005).

Pike received British Independent Film Award nominations for her supporting roles in An Education (2009) and Made in Dagenham (2010), and appeared in such mainstream films as Johnny English Reborn (2011), Wrath of the Titans (2012), Jack Reacher (2012), and The World's End (2013). Her performance in the psychological thriller Gone Girl (2014) received critical acclaim, winning the Saturn Award for Best Actress and receiving a nomination for the Academy Award for Best Actress. 

Pike portrayed Ruth Williams Khama in the biopic A United Kingdom (2016) and Marie Colvin in the war film A Private War (2018), for which she was nominated for the Golden Globe Award for Best Actress in a Motion Picture – Drama. She won a Primetime Emmy Award for her role in State of the Union (2019) and a Golden Globe Award for her performance in I Care a Lot (2020). Since 2021, she has starred in the Amazon fantasy series The Wheel of Time.

Early life and education
Pike was born in 1979 in Hammersmith, London, the only child of opera singers Julian Pike and Caroline Friend.

She attended Badminton School in Bristol, and while appearing as Juliet in a production of Romeo and Juliet at the National Youth Theatre, she was noticed by an agent who helped her embark upon a professional career.

After being turned down by every stage school to which she applied, she gained a place to read English literature at Wadham College, Oxford. She graduated with an Upper Second-class honours degree in 2001, having taken a year off to pursue her acting career, gaining stage experience in David Hare's Skylight, Arthur Miller's All My Sons, and several plays by William Shakespeare.

Acting career 
While she was still at Oxford, Pike acted in and directed various plays, including one by Simon Chesterman, who was then a graduate student. She made appearances on British television shows, including A Rather English Marriage (1998), Wives and Daughters (1999), and the miniseries Love in a Cold Climate (2001). She appeared as Sarah Beaumont in an episode of the series Foyle's War.

After graduating, she was offered a role as a Bond girl and MI6 agent assigned to aid James Bond in Die Another Day, and also appeared in the show Bond Girls Are Forever and, shortly afterwards, the BAFTA tribute to the James Bond film series. She was the first Bond girl to have gone to Oxford. Pike then played Elizabeth Malet in The Libertine (2004), co-starring Johnny Depp, which won her the British Independent Film Award for Best Supporting Actress. In the same year, she portrayed Rose in Promised Land, a film about Israel, and starred as scientist Samantha Grimm in the cinematic adaptation of the computer game series Doom.

In 2005, she appeared as Jane, the elder sister of Elizabeth (played by Keira Knightley), in Pride & Prejudice. Pike then starred in the film adaptation of Anne Michaels' novel Fugitive Pieces. She starred as a successful attorney in the film Fracture, opposite Anthony Hopkins and Ryan Gosling. Pike was a judge at the Costa Book Awards in 2008.

Her stage credits include Hitchcock Blonde by Terry Johnson and Tennessee Williams' Summer and Smoke, both in London's West End, and Gas Light at London's Old Vic Theatre. In 2009, she played the title character in Madame De Sade during the Donmar's West End season.

In 2010, she appeared in the British film Made in Dagenham and in the Canadian film Barney's Version where she plays Miriam. That same year, she starred in a production of Hedda Gabler on UK tour.

Pike recorded voicework for a lead role in the film Jackboots on Whitehall (2010) and lent her voice to a series of James Bond audio books, narrating The Spy Who Loved Me. Also in 2010, Pike played the part of Pussy Galore in the BBC Radio 4 adaptation of Fleming's Goldfinger. In 2011, Pike played the part of Kate Sumner in the Bond spoof film Johnny English Reborn, playing a psychologist and English's love interest. The film is a sequel to the 2003 film Johnny English and was a box office success, taking over $160 million.

In 2012, she played the role of Queen Andromeda in the fantasy epic Wrath of the Titans. She replaced Alexa Davalos, who had played the role in Clash of the Titans and had dropped out due to a scheduling conflict. Taking the role in Wrath of the Titans meant she had to drop out of consideration for a role in Man of Steel. Although the film was not well received by critics, it grossed over $300 million and critics considered her performance to be one of the film's highlights. She starred as Helen Rodin, the female lead alongside Tom Cruise in the thriller Jack Reacher, an adaptation of the novel One Shot by author Lee Child. The film opened to positive critical reception and grossed over $218 million.

After a supporting role in The World's End (2013), Pike starred in the David Fincher-directed thriller Gone Girl (2014), a film adaptation of Gillian Flynn's novel of the same name. Featuring opposite Ben Affleck, Pike was cast as Amy Dunne, a woman who goes missing on her fifth wedding anniversary. According to Fincher, Pike was his first choice for the role because he wanted someone who was not widely known, Pike having not appeared in any major leading role prior to the film's commencement, and because he found her enigmatic and couldn't easily read her. The film was a box office hit, earning over $356 million in global ticket sales. The movie and Pike's performance both earned widespread acclaim from critics.

Richard Lawson of Vanity Fair wrote that the film is "Smartly shot, detailed ... and performed" and called Pike's portrayal "a star-makingly good performance, spellbinding in its operatic mix of tones and temperatures." Todd McCarthy of The Hollywood Reporter said that she "is powerful and commanding ... Physically and emotionally, Pike looks to have immersed herself in this profoundly calculating character, and the results are impressive." She was nominated for the Academy Award for Best Actress, BAFTA Award for Best Actress in a Leading Role, Critics' Choice Movie Award for Best Actress, Golden Globe Award for Best Actress – Motion Picture Drama and Screen Actors Guild Award for Outstanding Performance by a Female Actor in a Leading Role.

From 2015, she voiced Lady Penelope Creighton-Ward in the remake of Gerry Anderson's Thunderbirds Are Go produced by ITV in conjunction with Weta Workshop. In February 2016, she starred in the music video for "Voodoo in My Blood" by Massive Attack, directly inspired by the subway scene with Isabelle Adjani in the movie Possession (1981) directed by Andrzej Żuławski.

In 2017, she took the role of The Woman in the short film The Human Voice, written and directed by Patrick Kennedy and based on the play La voix humaine by Jean Cocteau, for which she won Best Actress at the Oxford International Film Festival.

In 2018, Pike was cast as war correspondent Marie Colvin in A Private War, directed by Matthew Heineman and based on "Marie Colvin's Private War", a Vanity Fair article by Marie Brenner. She was nominated for a Golden Globe Award and Satellite Award for Best Actress in a Motion Picture – Drama.

In 2019, she was cast in the role of Moiraine in Amazon Prime Video's adaptation of Robert Jordan's fantasy epic The Wheel of Time, which was released in November 2021. Her other films include the thriller The Informer and the biopic Radioactive; in the latter, she played Marie Curie.

In 2021, Pike starred as con artist Marla Grayson in the crime thriller I Care a Lot, directed by J Blakeson and co-starring Peter Dinklage, Eiza González and Dianne Wiest. Her performance received universal acclaim; David Rooney of The Hollywood Reporter said "Pike brings crisp efficiency and dead-eyed amorality to a legal conservator", and ABC News journalist Peter Travers wrote that "Pike makes a feast of the role". At the 78th Golden Globe Awards, she won the Golden Globe Award for Best Actress in a Motion Picture – Comedy or Musical.

In 2021, Pike starred in and executive produced the eight episode historical fiction podcast Edith!. The scripted podcast dramatises a period during the Woodrow Wilson presidency when Wilson was incapacitated by a stroke and First Lady Edith Wilson took the reins of power while he recovered. Clark Gregg plays the role of President Wilson and Esther Povitsky portrays Trudy Grayson, the First Lady's best friend.

In 2022, it was announced that Pike would star in Emerald Fennell's second feature film, which is rumored to be titled Saltburn. She is also committed to lead the thriller Rich Flu, with Pablo Larraín producing the film.

Other work
In 2021, Pike narrated the audiobook of Paula Hawkins' novel, A Slow Fire Burning.

She also voiced an audiobook of The Eye of the World, the first book in the Wheel of Time series. In July 2022 it was announced that she would also voice audiobook versions of The Great Hunt and The Dragon Reborn.

Personal life
While at Oxford, Pike was in a relationship with Simon Woods which lasted two years. They later played the lovers Jane Bennet and Charles Bingley in Pride & Prejudice. She then became engaged to the director of that production, Joe Wright; their engagement ended in 2008.

Since December 2009, Pike has been in a relationship with Robie Uniacke, a businessman, and they have two sons, both fluent in Mandarin.

In 2015, Pike signed an open letter for which the ONE Campaign had been collecting signatures; the letter was addressed to Angela Merkel and Nkosazana Dlamini-Zuma, urging them to focus on women, as they would serve as the head of the Group of Seven (G7) and the African Union (AU), respectively, which would start to set the priorities for development funding in preparation for a United Nations (UN) summit in September 2015, which was intended to establish new development goals for the next  generation.

In 2021, Pike became an investor in, and the creative director for, the psychedelic-inspired meditation app Lumenate, which aims to guide the user into an altered state of consciousness.

Filmography

Film

Television

Stage

Music videos

Podcasts

Accolades

See also
 List of British actors
 List of actors with Academy Award nominations
 List of British Academy Award nominees and winners

Notes

References

External links

 

1979 births
20th-century British actresses
21st-century British actresses
Actresses from London
Alumni of Wadham College, Oxford
Audiobook narrators
British Shakespearean actresses
British film actresses
British stage actresses
British television actresses
British voice actresses
Living people
National Youth Theatre members
People educated at Badminton School
Primetime Emmy Award winners
WFTV Award winners
British radio actresses
Best Musical or Comedy Actress Golden Globe (film) winners
People from Hammersmith